Mike Pomichter is an American ice hockey coach and former left wing who was an All-American for Boston University.

Career
Pomichter was a highly rated prospect and was selected in the second round of the 1991 NHL Draft. He began attending Boston University the following fall and played well for the hockey team. Pomichter finished second in scoring for the Terriers as a freshman and helped the team earn a berth in the NCAA Tournament. His numbers declined slightly as sophomore but Pomichter missed a few games to play for Team USA at the World Junior Championships. While BU finished 2nd in the Hockey East standings and tournament once more, they were still afforded the second eastern seed for the NCAA Tournament. They handled Northern Michigan in the quarterfinals to make the Frozen Four but were soundly defeated in the national semifinal. While the season didn't end as they would have liked, BU was the only team to beat Maine that season, preventing their conference rival from posting an undefeated record.

In Pomichter's junior season he began showing the talent that led him to be a second-round pick. He led the Terriers in scoring by 10 points and led the team to a program record 34 wins. Pomichter was named an All-American and helped BU win a conference title, enabling the team to receive the top eastern seed in the NCAA tournament. The Terriers won their first two games by identical 4–1 margins and reached the championship game. They faced off against a surprising Lake Superior State who had knocked them out the year before and were looking for a measure of revenge. Instead, BU was stunned by a dominating performance and were handed the worst championship defeat in over 30 years. Pomichter assisted on Boston University's only goal of the game and ended up as the runner-up after a 1–9 loss.

Despite having a year of eligibility remaining, Pomichter left school in 1994 and began his professional career. He spent his entire first season with the Indianapolis Ice but didn't produce anything like he would have wanted. Despite the low offensive numbers, Pomichter joined the US national team for the World Championships. He helped the team finish atop their bracket but they lost their quarterfinal match and finished the tournament in 6th place. The following season, Pomichter's right were traded to the Toronto Maple Leafs and he began a life as a hockey vagabond. For four consecutive years, Pomichter played for at least three different teams, wearing 10 different uniforms across 4 minor leagues. His last real chance at an NHL stint came with a 25-game tryout contract with the expansion Wilkes-Barre/Scranton Penguins but he was released after 16 games. Pomichter returned to the United Hockey League the following year and retired in 2002.

After 9 years away from the game, Pomichter returned for a handful of games in the Federal Hockey League. After his final game in 2016, Pomichter turned to coaching, appearing as an assistant for the New England Prospects in the 2019 Quebec pee-wee tournament.

Statistics

Regular season and playoffs

International

Awards and honors

References

External links

1973 births
Living people
AHCA Division I men's ice hockey All-Americans
American men's ice hockey left wingers
Ice hockey people from New Haven, Connecticut
Boston University Terriers men's ice hockey players
Indianapolis Ice players
Cornwall Aces players
Portland Pirates players
St. John's Maple Leafs players
Jacksonville Lizard Kings players
Chicago Wolves players
Baltimore Bandits players
Springfield Falcons players
Cincinnati Mighty Ducks players
Saginaw Gears (UHL) players
Wilkes-Barre/Scranton Penguins players
New Haven Knights players
Manchester Monarchs (AHL) players
Chicago Blackhawks draft picks